The Hôtel des Trois Couronnes is a hotel in Vevey, Switzerland. It was built in 1842 on the ruins of the "Belles Truches" castle, built in 1376 (1). This building once destroyed left the place to a hotel built by Philippe Franel and inaugurated  on May 3, 1842 (3) under the name "Hôtel Monnet" (3), the name of its owner back then. Gabriel Monnet named it "Trois Couronnes" because he owned an inn of the same name, also situated on Vevey's Rue du Simplon (4).

Originally built with a direct access to Lake Geneva, the building lost it in 1863 with the construction of the lakeside promenade. In 1890, several transformations occurred: two annexes were added to the main building, as well as a ballroom in the west wing and a new residential area in the east wing (5).

The building is registered as a cultural property of national value (6). It was entirely renovated in 2000 and since 2003 is a Swiss historical hotel (7).

Among the many celebrities who stayed at the hotel, three crowned heads allowed the hotel property to justify its name: Queen Olga of Greece, the Maharajah Holkar of Indore and King William III of the Netherlands (8).

Inspired by the hotel's intrigue, the writer Henry James wrote his short story Daisy Miller.

Bibliography 
 Fédia Muller, Vevey et l'Hôtel des trois couronnes, 1958

References 

Frédéric Jean Charles de Gingins-La-Sarra, Histoire de la ville de Vevey et de son avouerie: depuis son origine jusqu'au XIVème siècle ; suivie d'une Notice sur la baronnie du Châtelard et de Montreux ; des tables généalogiques des sires de la Maison d'Oron et d'un plan de Vevey au Moyen âge, 1863, p. 43-44
Dave Lüthi, Eugène Jost: architecte du passé retrouvé, PPUR presses polytechniques, coll. « Les Archives de la construction moderne », 2001, p. 43
John Coindet, Vevey et ses environs: avec deux panoramas indicateurs du lac et des montagnes, F. Mack, 1862, p. 8
Pascal Hoffer, Grands Hôtels Palaces: Les bâtisseurs de rêve, Éditions Cabédita, coll. « Archives vivantes romandes », 2003, p. 18

Hotels in Switzerland
Hotel buildings completed in 1842
1842 establishments in Switzerland
19th-century architecture in Switzerland